Ilkari Maru is a Central Australian Indigenous band from the 1980s. They played country rock music and sing in English and Pitjantjatjara. They released two albums through CAAMA Music, Ilkari Maru (1984) and Lightning Strikes (Wangangarangk Rungkanu) (1987).

References

Indigenous Australian musical groups
South Australian musical groups